Michel Auger (November 18, 1830 – May 12, 1909) was a Canadian politician, farmer and mill owner. He was elected to the House of Commons of Canada in the 1882 federal election as an Independent Liberal, representing the riding of Shefford.

Born in St. Pie, Lower Canada, Auger was educated at the Grand Ligne Mission School and at the Hamilton Academy in Hamilton, New York. In 1856, he married Priscilla Nicol. Auger served five years as mayor of Sainte-Prudentienne, a village now within the modern municipality of Roxton Pond.

He first ran in the 1878 election as an Independent Liberal in opposition to the party's incumbent MP Lucius Seth Huntington, but was defeated by Huntington. In 1882, however, local Conservative supporters swung solidly behind Auger in a bid to punish Huntington for his role in exposing the Pacific Scandal, resulting in Auger's election.

He ran for reelection in the 1887 election as an Independent Liberal, but was defeated by Conservative Antoine Audet. He died in Toronto in 1909.

References

External links

1830 births
1909 deaths
Independent Liberal MPs in Canada
Members of the House of Commons of Canada from Quebec
Mayors of places in Quebec